Cynoglossus attenuatus, commonly known as the Fourline tonguesole, is a species of tonguefish. It is commonly found in the western Indian Ocean off the eastern coast of Africa, from Delagoa Bay, Mozambique to Durban in South Africa.

References
Fishbase

Cynoglossidae
Fish described in 1904